Shyamali (Bengali: শ্যামলী) is a 1956 Indian Bengali-language romantic drama film directed by Ajoy Kar and stars Kaberi Bose as the title character Shyamali. Uttam Kumar stars in this movie as the male protagonist. The film based on the novel in same name of Nirupama Devi. Music director of the film Kalipada Sen. The film was remade in Tamil in 1966 as Kodimalar.

Plot
Shyamali (kabari basu) was a deaf and mute girl. Nobody used to give her much attention. But she was like a normal girl who had dreams in her eyes and feelings in her heart. She also had the dreams of her own family. It was her sister's marriage day. Her sister was getting ready. She also dressed up like a bride. Hher father thought that God also wanted that Shayamali should get married and thought he will keep his daughter with him, but the groom (uttam kumar) accepted her. But the groom's mother didnot accept her. And the separation begins when she gets separated from her husband. She becomes sick, then again he has to bring Shamali to his house again. Then groom's mother accepted her.

Cast
 Uttam Kumar
 Kaberi Bose
 Anubha Gupta

Soundtrack

Lyrics was written by Pandit Bhusan and Gouri Prasanna Majumder

Reception
The film is based on Nirupama Devi's novel of same name. The novel was remade before in theater in 1953 to 1956 under Star Theater banner where also Uttam worked as hero and Sabitri Chatterjee as Shyamali. That Shyamali drama create a record in theater and ran over 486 night show.

Remakes
The movie was remade in Tamil in 1966 as Kodimalar starring Muthuraman and Vijayakumari in lead role.

References

External links
 

1956 films
Indian black-and-white films
Bengali-language Indian films
1950s Bengali-language films
Films directed by Ajoy Kar
Bengali films remade in other languages
Indian romantic drama films
1956 romantic drama films